Bay de Noc may refer to one of several places in the U.S. state of Michigan:

Little Bay de Noc
Big Bay de Noc
Bay de Noc Township, Michigan, on the peninsula separating the Big and Little Bays de Noc